Libel is a verse genre primarily of the Renaissance, descended from the tradition of invective in classical Greek and Roman poetry.  Libel is usually expressly political, and balder and coarser than satire.  Libels were generally not published but circulated among friends and political partisans in manuscript.

Classical roots

In ancient Greece, invective verse generally existed in the form of epigrams written, almost always anonymously, against public figures.  In Latin, the genre grew in prestige and boldness, as major authors including Juvenal and Catullus wrote extended invectives without the cushion of anonymity.  One of Catullus's fiercer examples, expunged from most post-classical collections of his work until the 20th century, is Catullus 16, written against two critics:

Cicero's In Pisonem, a hyperbolic attack on Lucius Calpurnius Piso Caesoninus, is one of the best-known political examples.

Renaissance English examples

In 17th-century manuscript culture, in which verses were copied out and distributed among (usually aristocratic) social groups, libel achieved a new standing.  At the same time, the growing power of Parliament allowed the genre a new currency, since prominent members of Parliament could be attacked with greater freedom than could royalty.  Libels frequently substituted humor and scatological inventiveness for poetic quality, as in the case of this well-known and much-circulated example, "The Censure of the Parliament Fart," which was in response to an audible emission by MP Henry Ludlow in 1607:

Downe came grave auntient Sir John CrookeAnd redd his message in his booke.Fearie well, Quoth Sir William Morris, Soe:But Henry Ludlowes Tayle cry’d Noe.Up starts one fuller of devotionThen Eloquence; and said a very ill motionNot soe neither quoth Sir Henry JenkinThe Motion was good; but for the stinckingWell quoth Sir Henry Poole it was a bold trickeTo Fart in the nose of the bodie politique

However, libels were also written by much better poets with considerably more technical achievement.  John Wilmot, 2nd Earl of Rochester was one of the more accomplished practitioners; Rochester is still held in high esteem by literary critics.

See also 
Monarchomachs

References

External links
Catullus at perseus.org
Web edition of Early Stuart Libels

Genres of poetry
Latin poetry
English poetry